Anthras is an unincorporated community and coal town in Campbell County, Tennessee. It is located along Tennessee State Route 90 in the Clearfork Valley between Tackett Creek and Eagan.

References

Unincorporated communities in Campbell County, Tennessee
Unincorporated communities in Tennessee
Coal towns in Tennessee